Dee Hoggan (born 1990) is a Scottish international lawn and indoor bowler.

Bowls career
In 2016, she won the national mixed pairs title with her uncle  and the following year she became the National Singles Champion at the Scottish National Bowls Championships. After winning the 2017 Scottish National singles title she subsequently won the singles at the British Isles Bowls Championships in 2018.

In 2019, she won a silver medal at the European Bowls Championships and in 2020, she was selected for the 2020 World Outdoor Bowls Championship in Australia.

In 2022, she competed in the women's singles and the women's triples at the 2022 Commonwealth Games.

References

Scottish female bowls players
1990 births
Living people
Bowls players at the 2022 Commonwealth Games